Kim dynasty may refer to:
The later rulers of Silla, who were mostly members of the Gyeongju Kim clan
Rulers of Geumgwan Gaya
Kim dynasty (North Korea), the rulers of North Korea since Kim Il-sung in 1948

See also
Kim (surname)
Jin dynasty (disambiguation)